The Museum of Vancouver (MOV) (formerly the Vancouver Museum and prior to that the Centennial Museum) is a civic history museum located in Vanier Park, Vancouver, British Columbia. The MOV is the largest civic museum in Canada and the oldest museum in Vancouver. The museum was founded in 1894 and went through a number of iterations before being rebranded as the Museum of Vancouver in 2009.  It creates Vancouver-focused exhibitions and programs that encourage conversations about what was, is, and can be Vancouver.  It shares an entrance and foyer with the H. R. MacMillan Space Centre but the MOV is much larger and occupies the vast majority of the space in the building complex where both organisations sit as well as separate collections storage facilities in another building.

History
The museum was founded by the Art, Historical, and Scientific Association of Vancouver (AHSA), which formed on April 17, 1894, with the objective of cultivating "a taste for the beauties and refinements in life." Shortly after its inaugural meeting the AHSA opened its first temporary exhibition ('Paintings and Curiosities') in rented premises on the top floor of the Dunn Building on Granville Street, Vancouver.  This exhibition triggered a series of donations to the new museum's collections which were mostly natural history or ethnographic in origin.  The first recorded donation to the collection was of taxidermy - a stuffed Trumpeter Swan which was donated by Mr Sydney Williams in 1895. Regular purchasing of artefacts for the collections of the AHSA began in 1898 and acquisitions were eclectic and multi-disciplinary reflecting the interests of the decision-makers rather than any strategic approach to collecting.

As the collection grew the question was raised as to a permanent place to display it and following discussions with the Vancouver City Council agreement was reached on August 26, 1903 that title to the museum collection would pass to the Council in exchange for the provision of suitable and convenient premises where they could be displayed.  It was agreed at the same time that the new museum would be located on the top floor of the new Carnegie Library. The museum opened at this location on April 19, 1905.

Between 1915 and 1925 the museum and the AHSA attempted to establish in Stanley Park a reconstructed First Nations village built around a series of major totem and house poles that had been acquired by the AHSA.  This project ultimately failed but it did result in the current display of totem poles in Stanley Park which remain one of the most photographed tourist attractions in Vancouver.

In 1930 the museum sponsored an extensive series of archaeological excavations of the Marpole Midden which was one of the most important archaeological sites on the Pacific Northwest Coast but was also an unceded ancestral territory of the Musqueam First Nation and was where the village of c̓əsnaʔəm (Musqueam Marpole Village Site) had been located.  The outcome of this has been dealt with in the award-winning exhibition c̓əsnaʔəm, the city before the city, a joint project between the Musqueam Indian Band, the Museum of Vancouver and the Museum of Anthropology.

In 1957 the public library which shared the Carnegie building with the museum moved to a new dedicated building in Burrard Street tripling the available storage and display space for the museum and in 1959 the museum was incorporated into the City Council and became a city department under the control of a Civic Museum Board.  A report was commissioned on the future of the museum (the Heinrich Report of 1965) and this recommended the building of a new museum on the south shore of False Creek near the Burrard Bridge.  Federal and provincial money was made available for the 1967 Confederation Centennial celebrations and the current building was constructed which opened to the public in October 1968. From the opening of the new museum building to 1981, the museum was branded as Centennial Museum; before reverting its name back to Vancouver Museum.

In 1972 the city council relinquished its control of the museum and a joint Museum and Planetarium Association was formed as a descendant of the original AHSA which founded the museum. In 1977 the museum was designated a Category A cultural institution by the federal government and named in the Cultural Property Export and Import Act.

In 2009, the museum was re-branded as the Museum of Vancouver, in an attempt to reflect its changed focus to Vancouver rather than the lower mainland region of British Columbia as originally set out in its objectives and reaffirmed in 1977.

Building

The building is located at 1100 Chestnut Street in Vanier Park, in the neighbourhood of Kitsilano in Vancouver, BC. The museum is situated at the south end of Vanier Park, with the park acting as a connecting greenspace between the Vancouver Maritime Museum, Bard on the Beach, the Vancouver Archives, and the Vancouver Academy of Music.

The building was constructed in 1967 to a design by the architect Gerald Hamilton who had studied at Leeds University before moving to Vancouver in 1950. Hamilton was a practitioner of the New Formalism school of architecture and its most visible proponent in Vancouver at the time.

Originally, the building was planned to only house a museum, but a generous gift by the lumber magnate H.R. MacMillan allowed the architect to incorporate a planetarium into the design. As a result, the distinctive roof was added, designed to reflect the shape of a woven basket hat made by Northwest Coast First Nations people.  This decision has created ongoing confusion over the identity of the building as many people associate it mistakenly as only a planetarium whereas the vast majority of the building space is occupied by the galleries of the Museum of Vancouver and the planetarium part was renamed the H.R. MacMillan Space Centre in the late 1990s.
The building was officially dedicated on May 20, 1967 and the ceremony was attended by Her Royal Highness Princess Alexandra, who was the granddaughter of Queen Mary and King George V and also a cousin of Queen Elizabeth II.

Alex Bozikovic remarks that the building closesly resembles the John Nugent Studio designed by Saskatchewan architect Clifford Wiens built six years earlier.  The building is considered iconic by Vancouverites and is one of the most immediately recognisable buildings in Vancouver. It was nicknamed 'the Taj Mahal on the creek' when first built and is characterised by its sweeping conical shape and reflecting pools crossed by curved pedestrian bridges.

Collection
The museum has a large collection of objects which reflect to a large extent the interests of the donors and of the curators who made decisions on acquisitions over the years in a similar way to many museums that were established in this way.  The collection is nationally significant but much of it remains in storage due to a lack of exhibition space.

The collection includes the First Nations and Oriental artefacts that were collected by Mary Lipsett who established along with her husband the Lipsett Indian Museum which opened in a former aquarium in the PNE grounds in 1941.  This collection was said to be the finest in Canada when reported on by the Vancouver Sun in 1948 and Mary Lipsett was well-respected for her positive relationship with the First Nations and was honoured with the Kwawlewith name 'Ha-wini-po-la-o-gua', which means “a matriarch to whom many come for good counsel.”  She donated the entire collection to the then Vancouver Museum and it remains in storage there.

Particular strengths in the MOV collection include:

Ethnology 
One of the most significant Pacific Northwest Coast First Nations collections in Canada with assemblages such as:
 
 Argillite carvings 
 Small wooden carvings (mini totem poles, figures) 
 Monumental wooden sculptures (totem poles, house posts) 
 Baskets (extensive including Nuu-chah-nuith and Coast Salish) 
 Objects carved by Charles Edenshaw including the Edenshaw Casket 
 Glass slides painted by Frederick Alexcee 
 Basket and bracelet collected by George Vancouver on his first voyage to the Pacific Northwest 
 Selected masks, boxes, bowls, canoes, carvings, regalia 
 Pauline Johnson's performance costume 
 Human seated figure bowls and other anthropomorphic or zoomorphic carvings in stone

Asian antiquities 
These include collections such as:

 Chinese art objects dating from the Shang dynasty (16th-11th century BCE) to the Qing dynasty (1644-1911) including a comprehensive ceramics collection from the Han dynasty  (206 BCE- 220 CE) to the Qing dynasty (1644-1911; a comprehensive coin collection; ivory carvings, jade carvings, lacquer objects, snuff bottles, textiles, and armour, largely form the Qing dynasty (1644-1911)
 Japanese objects dating from the Muromachi period (1392-1572) to the Meiji period (1868-1912 ) including woodblock prints, ceramics, ivory carvings, textiles, armour, swords, sword accessories, Buddhist and Shinto objects and dolls (20th century). The sword guard collection of over 400 items is the finest public collection in Canada.
 Indian, Nepalese and Tibetan stone, wood and bronze sculpture, textiles and paintings from the 16th to 20th century.
 Thai bronze Buddhist statues, Buddhist scriptures, textiles and ceramics dating from the 12th to the 20th century.
 Vietnamese and Cambodian ceramics.

Egyptian antiquities 
These include:
 Ancient Egyptian collection, especially mummified boy (previously nicknamed 'Diana') discovered one mile from the Valley of the Kings near Luxor in 1915.  The mummy wrappings are inscribed "Penechates, son of Hatres" and it probably dates  from the 1st to the 3rd century CE
 Mummified crocodiles, hawk and cats
 Material excavated by Sir Flinders Petrie who was a member of the Vancouver Museum Board in 1934

History of Vancouver 
These include objects such as:

 Furnishings and memorabilia related to important individuals, civic events, functions and structures
 Edwardian household furnishings and accessories, including an excellent collection of locally-made stained glass
 Street furniture, including signs, street lamps, mailboxes and building fragments from Vancouver
 Material related to Chinatown and the Chinese community, especially the Yip Family Collection from the Wing Sang Building
 Tools, equipment and furnishings related to Vancouver shops, businesses and industries
 Women’s clothing shoes and accessories worn and/or made in Vancouver, c. 1870-1980
 Toys, dolls and children’s clothing used in Vancouver, c. 1890-1980
 Objects used in the communication of sounds and images in Vancouver, c. 1890-1970
 Paintings by early Vancouver artists 1900s-1930s
 Objects related to major events: Habitat 76, EXPO 86, 1990 Gay Games, 2010 Olympic Games
 Objects related to Rogers Sugar Refinery
 Uniforms, accessories, badges, ephemera, etc. related to public transit from BCER to Translink
 An extensive collection of neon signs

Galleries 

The museum has a number of permanent galleries that cover the entire history of Vancouver in an experience which includes sound and film. In addition to the historical permanent galleries, permanent galleries at the Museum of Vancouver include:

 Neon Vancouver | Ugly Vancouver
 1900s–1920s History Gallery: Gateway to the Pacific
 1930s–1940s History Gallery: Boom, Bust, and War
 1950s History Gallery: Vancouver in The Fifties
 1960s–1970s History Gallery: You Say You Want A Revolution

While most of these galleries explore the history of Vancouver during its specified time period, the Neon Vancouver gallery features a collection of neon signs that were used in Vancouver from the 1950s to 1970s.

Along with its permanent galleries, the Museum of Vancouver typically hosts a number of temporary exhibitions. Three temporary exhibitions are presently held at the museum. The c̓əsnaʔəm, the city before the city exhibition was developed in partnership with the Musqueam Indian Band, with plans to remain at the museum from January 2015 to January 2021. The second exhibition, HAIDA NOW: A Visual Feast of Innovation and Tradition opened at the museum in March 2018, and will continue to be held there until June 2021. The museum's most recent exhibition, Acts of Resistance, opened on February 5, 2020 and runs until December 2020.

References

External links
Museum of Vancouver official website

History museums in British Columbia
Museums in Vancouver
Kitsilano